Anthodiscus is a genus of plant in family Caryocaraceae described as a genus in 1818.

The entire genus is endemic to South America.

Species
 Anthodiscus amazonicus Gleason & A.C.Sm. - Brazil, Colombia, Ecuador
 Anthodiscus chocoensis Prance - Colombia
 Anthodiscus fragrans Sleumer - Ecuador
 Anthodiscus klugii Standl. ex Prance - Ecuador, N Peru
 Anthodiscus mazarunensis Gilly - Suriname, Guyana, Venezuela
 Anthodiscus montanus Gleason - Colombia
 Anthodiscus obovatus Benth. ex Wittm.  - Colombia, Venezuela, N Brazil
 Anthodiscus peruanus Baill. - Ecuador, N Peru
 Anthodiscus pilosus  Ducke - Colombia, N Peru
 Anthodiscus trifoliatus G.Mey. - Guyana

References

 
Malpighiales genera
Flora of South America
Taxonomy articles created by Polbot